A kartika or drigug (or kartrika in Nepal) is a small, crescent-shaped, hand-held ritual flaying knife used in the tantric ceremonies of Vajrayana Buddhism. The kartari is said to be "one of the quintessential attributes of the wrathful Tantric deities." It is commonly known as the "knife of the dakinis." Its shape is similar to the Inuit ulu or woman's knife, which is used for many things including cleaning skins.

While the kartari is normally held in the right hand of a dakini in Vajrayana iconography and spiritual practice, occasionally it can be seen being held by esoteric male deities,  such as certain forms of Yamantaka. It is also found frequently in the iconography of the Tibetan Buddhist spiritual practice of Chöd.

Iconography
In terms of iconography,

The same way that the bell and vajra are usually paired ritual items in Vajrayana spiritual practice and iconography (one is held in the right hand and the other simultaneously held in the left), the kartika usually appears as a pair with the kapala (skull-cup).

The shape of the kartika or drigug, with its crescent shape and the hook on the end, is derived from the shape of a traditional Indian butcher's knife.

Depictions of Vajrayogini typically contain the kartika as one of her attributes. In the iconography of the enlightened dakinis and tantric female yidams, it is common to find the hooked kartika knife in her right hand and the skull cup in her left, representing "the inseparable union of wisdom and skillful means."

Meanings
As one author writes about the meaning of the kartika:

The kartika is used to symbolize the severance of all material and worldly bonds and is often crowned with a vajra, which is said to destroy ignorance, and thus leading to enlightenment. Another more nuanced interpretation says that "the kartika represents the severing of the two Buddhist obscurations of defilements (klesha avarana) and knowledge (jneya avarana) that obstruct the path of enlightenment." The kartika is also used to cut through human obscurations to progress on the spiritual path including "pride, lack of belief, lack of devotion, distraction, inattention, and boredom."

Gallery

Notes

References

Tibetan Buddhist ritual implements
Weapons in Buddhist mythology
Ritual weapons
Vajrayana